Other Men's Wives is a lost 1919 American silent drama film directed by Victor Schertzinger and written by C. Gardner Sullivan. The film stars Dorothy Dalton, Forrest Stanley, Holmes Herbert, Dell Boone, Elsa Lorimer, and Hal Clements. The film was released on June 15, 1919, by Paramount Pictures.

Plot

As described in a film magazine, society girl Cynthia Brock (Dalton) is made penniless by the death of her father and about to relinquish her place in her social circle when Fenwick Flint (Herbert), a wealthy bachelor, persuades her in assisting him in breaking up the happiness and marriage of James and Viola Gordon (Stanley and Boone) so that he may marry the lady. In her weak moment she accepts and soon has James at her feet. Then she falls in love with her victim and refuses to stage the final scene of the scheme that will provide the grounds for the divorce. The situation results in her fainting, and afterwards she tells the truth about the whole matter. James permits the divorce by his wife, and Cynthia returns Fenwick's money and goes to work. In due time she and James marry.

Cast
Dorothy Dalton as Cynthia Brock
Forrest Stanley as James Gordon
Holmes Herbert as Fenwick Flint 
Dell Boone as Viola Gordon
Elsa Lorimer as Mrs. Peyton-Andrews 
Hal Clements as Mr. Peyton-Andrews

References

External links 
 

1919 films
1910s English-language films
Silent American drama films
1919 drama films
Paramount Pictures films
Films directed by Victor Schertzinger
Lost American films
American black-and-white films
American silent feature films
1919 lost films
Lost drama films
1910s American films